Aurora Transit operated public transit within the town of Aurora, Ontario, Canada, from 1973 to 1999. From 1999 to 2001 transit service in Aurora was operated by Newmarket Transit. Service in the town is now provided by the current York Region Transit system.

History

Aurora's public transit system began operations in 1973. Like Newmarket, Aurora was much smaller in size and population than other southern York Region municipalities, which benefited from connections to GO Transit and the Toronto Transit Commission. Aurora Transit provided feeder service to GO Transit commuter trains and buses as well as community bus service to town's major destinations.

A fare arrangement between Aurora Transit and GO Transit allowed passengers to use Aurora Transit tickets on GO Transit 'route B' buses that provided local service on Yonge Street, provided the entire trip was within Aurora city limits (GO Transit zone 63). Passengers travelling to the neighboring Oak Ridges or Newmarket or (Zones 62 or 64) could still use Aurora Transit tickets with a cash supplement.

On August 30, 1998 Aurora Transit restructured its services into a single route with service in the southern part of the town provided by Richmond Hill Transit. At the same time Newmarket Transit route 77/11 was extended south on Bayview Avenue to connect with Aurora Transit's only route at Bayview Shopping Centre. Aurora Transit ended its operations on September 4, 1999, when the transit service in the town was transferred to Newmarket Transit. The latter became part of the York Region Transit on January 1, 2001 when the four regional transit systems were merged.

Route

 Regular Service Route – ran along various roads from and back to Aurora GO Station (Walton Drive, Batson Drive, Orchard Heights Boulevard, Crawford Rose Drive, Aurora Heights Drive, McLeod Drive, Wellington Street West, Murray Drive, Yonge Street, Dunning Avenue, Edward Street, Metcalfe Street, Berczy Street, Wellington Street East)
 Dial-A-Bus Route

Terminals

Aurora GO Station was the only dedicated transit facility used by Aurora Transit. The route stopped at two shopping malls:

 Aurora Bayview Centre – Aurora Centre (Bayview Shopping Centre) on Bayview Avenue north of Wellington Street East
 Aurora Shopping Centre – Yonge Street at Murray Drive

Fleet
Aurora's fleet was small due to the size and usage of public transit north of Toronto, as well as the key Yonge Street corridor was part of the GO Transit Yonge Street B routing.

 781 – Ontario Bus Industries 1978 Orion I 01.501 (Retired by 1998)
 891 – Ontario Bus Industries 1989 Orion I 01.502 (Operated by York Region Transit as of mid-2006 ) Retired.

A school bus adjusted for mass transit (Laidlaw 90230) was used briefly in the spring of 1999.

See also

Other agencies merged into York Region Transit and Viva (bus rapid transit):

 Markham Transit
 Vaughan Transit
 Richmond Hill Transit
 Newmarket Transit
 York Region Transit
 Metropolitan / Lake Simcoe Line – provided transit service to the Yonge Street area of Aurora from 1899 to 1930

External links
 Aurora Transit
 York Region Transit
 Aurora Transit roster

Transport in Aurora, Ontario
Transit agencies in Ontario
York Region Transit